HMS LST-403 was a United States Navy  that was transferred to the Royal Navy during World War II. As with many of her class, the ship was never named. Instead, she was referred to by her hull designation.

Construction
LST-403 was laid down on 23 August 1942, under Maritime Commission (MARCOM) contract, MC hull 923, by the Bethlehem-Fairfield Shipyard, Baltimore, Maryland; launched 24 October 1942; then transferred to the United Kingdom and commissioned on 8 December 1942.

Service history 
LST-403 saw no active service in the United States Navy. The tank landing ship was decommissioned and returned to United States Navy custody on 11 April 1946, and struck from the Navy list on 5 June 1946. On 5 December 1947, the ship was sold to Bosey, Philippines, for scrapping.

See also 
 List of United States Navy LSTs

Notes 

Citations

Bibliography 

Online resources

External links

 

Ships built in Baltimore
1942 ships
LST-1-class tank landing ships of the Royal Navy
World War II amphibious warfare vessels of the United Kingdom
S3-M2-K2 ships